The U.S. state of Vermont is divided into 256 municipalities, including 237 towns, 10 cities, 5 unincorporated towns and 4 gores. As of 2021, Vermont had 35 incorporated villages, which are municipal governments operating within a town and providing additional services.

Cities
Vermont has ten cities. In some cases there is a town and a city with the same name, such as Barre City which is almost entirely surrounded by the separate municipality of Barre Town.

Six of Vermont's 14 counties have at least one city within their borders. Five cities serve as the county seats for their respective counties and are indicated below with an asterisk (*).

Population
According to the 2020 census, 119,299 people, or 18.54% of the state's population, resided in Vermont's cities (excluding Essex Junction, which incorporated in 2022).

Towns

Unincorporated towns in Vermont are towns that had their charters revoked by the Vermont legislature due to lack of residents.  While still technically towns, their affairs are managed by a state-appointed supervisor and not by a local government.  These unincorporated towns are Averill, Ferdinand, Glastenbury, Lewis, and Somerset.

Gores 
In Vermont, a gore is seen as an unincorporated area of a county that is not part of any town, has limited self-government, and may be unpopulated. Vermont has 4 current gores.

Villages 

In the U.S. state of Vermont, villages are named communities located within the boundaries of a town. Villages may be incorporated or unincorporated.

An incorporated village is a defined area within a town that was either granted a village charter by a special act of the legislature, or organized under the general legislation. A village is a clearly defined municipality and provides a variety of municipal services, such as potable water, sewage, police and fire services, garbage collection, street lighting and maintenance, management of cemeteries, and building code enforcement. Other municipal services not provided by the village are provided by the parent town. Incorporated villages in Vermont are administratively similar to villages in New York. Vermont is the only state in New England that has incorporated villages.

As of 2021, there were 35 incorporated villages with active governments in Vermont. Historically, there were more but most have since disincorporated, while a few were chartered as cities. Below is a list of incorporated villages that have existed, ordered by date of incorporation. Currently existing villages are indicated in boldface.

References
 E.T. Howe, "Vermont Incorporated Villages: A Vanishing Institution", Vermont History 73, 16 (2005).
 Vermont Secretary of State, "List of Incorporated Villages," https://sos.vermont.gov/vsara/learn/municipalities/incorporated-villages/
 
 D.G. Sanford, Vermont Municipalities: an index to their charters and special acts, (Vermont Office of Secretary of State, 1986).
 J.S. Garland, New England town law: a digest of statutes and decisions concerning towns and town officers, (Boston Book Co., Boston, 1906).
 "Any community containing thirty or more houses may, with the approval of the selectmen of the town, receive a separate village organization. Their officials are a clerk, five trustees, a collector of taxes and a treasurer".
 Vermont Statutes Online, Title 24 and 24 Appendix
 U.S. Census Bureau, Census of population, data for 1930–2000.

See also 

 List of counties in Vermont
 List of census-designated places in Vermont
 List of gores in Vermont
 Vermont 251 Club – an organization whose members try to visit every town in Vermont.

References

External links 
 vt251.com A companion website for the Vermont 251 Club.

 

Vermont
Municipalities
Vermont
Local government in Vermont